Philip John Allen (5 November 1902 – May 1992) was an English professional footballer who played as a full back in the Football League for Brentford.

Career 
A full back, Allen joined Third Division South club Brentford in 1922. Confined mostly to the reserve team, he made just three first team appearances before departing at the end of the 1923–24 season. After his release, Allen dropped into non-League football and played for Southern League club Peterborough & Fletton United and Northamptonshire League clubs Wellingborough Town and Stamford.

Personal life 
Allen served in the Grenadier Guards.

Career statistics

References

English footballers
Brentford F.C. players
English Football League players
Peterborough & Fletton United F.C. players
Wellingborough Town F.C. players
Southern Football League players
Association football fullbacks
Grenadier Guards soldiers
Stamford A.F.C. players
1902 births
1992 deaths
Footballers from Hanwell
Military personnel from Middlesex
20th-century British Army personnel